Amblypharyngodon chulabhornae, the princess carplet, is a species of carplet in the family Cyprinidae from mainland south-east Asia.

Description
Amblypharyngodon chulabhornae has 10 soft rays in the dorsal fin with 8 in the anal fin, it has 31-32 vertebrae. It is distinguished from other species in the genus Amblypharyngodon in having a smaller number scales on the lateral row, 42-50 in A. chulabhornae compared to 50-79 in other species in the genus, likewise this species has 6-7 perforated scales along its lateral line  and 4-5 scales on a transverse row situated along the normal course of the lateral line in other fish and the pelvic fin base. The body is golden in colour, with a blue eye and lacks a barbel. Its maximum standard length is 30-40mm but mature females grow a little larger than the males and have a more rounded belly.

Habitat and distribution
Amblypharyngodon chulabhornae can be found in shallow standing water such as within paddy fields and in ditches, preferring vegetated areas with growths of floating and emergent vegetation as well seasonally flooded terrestrial grasses. It is found in the Chao Phraya and Mekong basin in Thailand, Laos and Cambodia, as well the Mae Klong basins and river systems in southeast Thailand extending into the upper Thai-Malay peninsula. It may have been introduced to Singapore and appears to be established there.

Habits
Amblypharyngodon chulabhornae probably feeds small invertebrates, zooplankton and algae. They are sociable fish and prefer to live in small schools. they breed by spawning, most likely scattering the eggs on the substrate and showing no care thereafter.

Conservation
It is still common and is treated as being of "Least Concern" by the IUCN but population in some areas appear to be in declining such as on Chae Phraya in Thauland while in waters around Phnom Penh the species remains common. It does not appear in the local fishmarkets but may be consumed by subsistence fishermen, and the main threat appears to be pollution. It is rare in the aquarium trade and if it is offered for sale in that trade this is probably as a result of bycatch by fishermen hunting other species.

Etymology
The generic name derives from the Ancient Greek amblús meaning "blunted", pháruks meaning throat and odṓn meaning "toothed" in referenced to the shape of the pharyngeal teeth, the specific name is in honour of H.R.H. Princess Chulabhorn Mahidol of Thailand in recognition of her interest in and patronage of the sciences and technology.

References

Amblypharyngodon
Taxa named by Chavalit Vidthayanon
Fish described in 1990
Taxa named by Maurice Kottelat